Richard House Kyle (April 30, 1937 – June 22, 2021) was a United States district judge of the United States District Court for the District of Minnesota.

Education and career

Born in St. Paul, Minnesota, Kyle received a Bachelor of Arts degree from the University of Minnesota in 1959 and a Bachelor of Laws from the University of Minnesota Law School in 1962. He was a law clerk for Judge Edward Devitt of the United States District Court for the District of Minnesota from 1962 to 1963. He was a state solicitor general in the Office of the Minnesota State Attorney General from 1968 to 1970. He was in private practice in St. Paul from 1963 to 1992.

District court service 

On March 20, 1992, Kyle was nominated by President George H. W. Bush to a seat on the United States District Court for the District of Minnesota vacated by Judge Robert G. Renner. Kyle was confirmed by the United States Senate on May 12, 1992, and received his commission on May 13, 1992. He assumed senior status on May 31, 2005 and was succeeded by Patrick J. Schiltz. Kyle died on June 22, 2021, aged 84.

References

Sources
 

1937 births
2021 deaths
People from Saint Paul, Minnesota
Judges of the United States District Court for the District of Minnesota
United States district court judges appointed by George H. W. Bush
20th-century American judges
University of Minnesota Law School alumni
University of Minnesota alumni
21st-century American judges